Saikul is the headquarters of Sadar Hills East subdivision and one of the principal towns under Sadar Hills Autonomous District Council in Manipur state of India. It is also the  46th reserved Assembly Constituency for Scheduled Tribes of the Manipur State Legislative Assembly. The town is located at 790 meters above sea level, 40 kilometres to the north of Imphal. It lies between NH-39 and NH-150 and the river Jildung passes beside the town. The town is governed by Saikul Hilltown Committee.

People
Saikul is inhabited by various tribes mainly the Thadou people. Kom, Vaiphei,  Tangkhul, Thangal, Koireng and Purum tribes also reside in few villages. The town also has some immigrant population such as Bihari, Marwari and Nepalese.

Festivals
Mim Kut, kalchuh kut and Chavang Kut some prominent festivals of the town. As majority  of the population are Christian, other festivals such as Christmas, New Year, Palm Sunday, Easter Sunday and Good Friday are also celebrated.

Education
Though comparatively average in educational performances, various schools and higher secondary schools are established since the last century to bring about transformation. Schools such as Model English Higher Secondary School, Christian English High School, L.L. Henjou High School and Thangtong Government Higher Secondary School meet the need of not only the people of Saikul subdivision but also different parts of the state.

References 

Villages in Sadar Hills
Cities and towns in Kangpokpi district
Kuki tribes